Lithophane ornitopus, the grey shoulder-knot, is a moth of the family Noctuidae. The species was first described by Johann Siegfried Hufnagel in 1766 and is found in most of the Palearctic realm from Ireland east to Siberia.

Technical description and variation

The wingspan is 32–38 mm. Its forewings are  grey white; a bifurcate black streak from base below cell; lines indistinct, pale with dotted edges; stigmata grey with partial black outlines and paler rings; the lower lobe of the reniform orange tinged; claviform sometimes connected by a black streak with outer line, and often a dark spot between the stigmata; submarginal line waved, white, preceded by dark marks; hindwing grey; the whiter forms are separated as ab. pallida Spul.

Biology
Adults are on wing from late August to November and, after overwintering, again from the end of February to mid-May. The larvae are bluish green dotted with white; dorsal and subdorsal lines white; spiracular line yellowish white. The larvae feed on various deciduous trees, but mainly oak (Quercus species) and can be found from April to June. It overwinters as an adult.

Subspecies
 Lithophane ornitopus ornitopus
 Lithophane ornitopus pitzalisi Hartig, 1976 (Sardinia)

References

External links
 
  Taxonomy
 Lepiforum e.V.
 De Vlinderstichting 

ornitopus
Moths described in 1766
Moths of Asia
Moths of Europe
Taxa named by Johann Siegfried Hufnagel